Idaho College of Osteopathic Medicine (ICOM) is a private, for-profit osteopathic medical school. Founded in 2016, ICOM is located at the Meridian campus of Idaho State University (ISU). At ICOM, students can earn a Doctor of Osteopathic Medicine (D.O.) degree.

History
Before ICOM was established, Idaho was the most populous state without a medical school of its own. Although Idaho is among the most rapidly growing areas of the country, the state ranks 49th in physicians per capita. In December 2017 COCA granted ICOM pre-accreditation status and authorized the recruitment of 162 students. ICOM matriculated its second class of students in August 2019.

Campus
Located in Meridian, Idaho, the three-story, 94,000-square-foot facility cost $34 million, and took Engineered Structures, Inc. (ESI) just thirteen months to build. Dekker/Perich/Sabatini, a New Mexico-based architecture firm, did the design.

ICOM's campus includes more than 12,000 feet of classroom space, including: two lecture halls, each with 250 seats; a clinical simulation center; a 3,5000-square-foot medical library; and a 3,479-square-foot osteopathic manipulative medicine (OMM) Lab. Additionally, 12 Objective Structured Clinical Examination (OSCE) rooms are located on the second floor.

ICOM has a 40-year agreement with Idaho State University-Meridian for use of its Treasure Valley Anatomy and Physiology Laboratory (TVAPL). There, ICOM's first-year medical students perform whole-body dissections on donated bodies, also known as cadavers.

Academics
As a free-standing medical school, ICOM only offers graduate-level training. ICOM awards the Doctor of Osteopathic Medicine degree (DO). This is a four-year degree with years 1 and 2 consisting of on-campus didactic lectures, small group assignments laboratory and clinical experiences. Years 3 and 4 are completed at selected clinical sites.

In November 2019, ICOM announced that it had been recognized as an Apple Distinguished School for 2019-2022 for its unique implementation of Apple technology in creating a culture of engagement amongst the students, faculty and staff at Idaho's first medical school. Apple Distinguished Schools are centers of innovation, leadership, and educational excellence that use Apple technology to inspire creativity, collaboration, and critical thinking. They showcase innovative uses of technology in learning, teaching, and the school environment and have documented results of academic accomplishment.

Student life
Students participate in several organizations and interest committees on campus. There are more than 30 student organizations represented on campus, ranging from national, professional and general interest.

References

External links
 Official website

Osteopathic medical schools in the United States
Educational institutions established in 2016
2016 establishments in Idaho